Thibault Rossard (born 28 August 1993) is a French professional volleyball player. He is a member of the France national team and the 2017 World League winner. At the professional club level, he plays for Asseco Resovia.

Personal life
His brother, Quentin is a volleyball player, as was his grandfather Jacques. His cousin, Nicolas Rossard was also a volleyball player.

Honours

Clubs
 National championships
 2015/2016  French Championship, with Arago de Sète

Youth national team
 2011  CEV U19 European Championship

Individual awards
 2011: CEV U19 European Championship – Best Outside Spiker 
 2013: FIVB U21 World Championship – Best Outside Spiker
 2016: French Championship – Most Valuable Player
 2016: French Championship – Best Receiver

References

External links

 
 Player profile at LegaVolley.it 
 Player profile at PlusLiga.pl 
 Player profile at Volleybox.net
 
 

1993 births
Living people
People from Soisy-sous-Montmorency
Sportspeople from Val-d'Oise
French men's volleyball players
Olympic volleyball players of France
Volleyball players at the 2016 Summer Olympics
French expatriate sportspeople in Poland
Expatriate volleyball players in Poland
French expatriate sportspeople in Turkey
Expatriate volleyball players in Turkey
French expatriate sportspeople in Italy
Expatriate volleyball players in Italy
Resovia (volleyball) players
Outside hitters
Opposite hitters